Peirrick Chavatte (born 10 February 1974) is a French former freestyle swimmer who competed in the 1996 Summer Olympics.

References

1974 births
Living people
French male freestyle swimmers
Olympic swimmers of France
Swimmers at the 1996 Summer Olympics